The Institute for Scientific Interchange (ISI Foundation, ISI) is an independent, resident-based research institute known for its work in complexity science, theoretical and mathematical physics. It is located in Turin (Italy, EU).

History 

ISI was founded in 1983 and supported by the regional government, the province and city of Turin, and by two banking institutions in Piedmont: Compagnia di San Paolo and the CRT Foundation.

In the 2011 SIR World Report of Institutional Rankings, ISI ranked 28th in Europe for scientific impact, 87th worldwide and 1/4th of the articles produced at ISI are in the top cited 10%.

The ISI worked with the CRT Foundation (in particular with the Lagrange Project) and the San Paolo Company.

Activities

Description 

The mission of ISI is to promote scientific research, interchange and cooperation at the highest degree of quality both in terms of creativity and originality of research and to represent a pillar of high level interdisciplinary training. ISI aims to create research groups in innovative and interdisciplinary labs, with a special focus on the science of complex systems.

ISI focuses on: complex networks, complexity science, mathematical physics, statistical physics and quantum physics research

Training

 Joint masters-level program:  the Master in Epidemiology, the Lagrange Scholarships
 Doctoral studies: possibility to host PhD students wishing to pursue full-time graduate studies under the supervision of an ISI faculty member. PhD students receive their doctoral degrees from a university partner, which can range in locations.
 Courses: Selection of planned courses each year, including cross-listed programs with universities and mini-courses given by ISI Faculty, associate faculty, and visiting researchers.

Alumni

 Jacob Biamonte, Former Research Group Leader of the Quantum Science Laboratory 

 Tullio Regge, First President of the ISI Foundation

Governance

Board of trustees

 Mario Rasetti, president
 Valentino Castellani, Regione Piemonte
 Pietro Terna, Provincia di Torino
 Piero Fassino, Città di Torino
 Giovanni Ferrero, Fondazione CRT

Scientific Advisory Board

 Porter Bibb, MediaTech Capital Partners
 Gunnar Carlsson, Stanford University
 Noshir Contractor, Northwestern University
 Kimmo Kaski, Aalto University
 Tomaso Poggio, MIT
 Francesco Profumo, IREN S.p.A.
 Mario Rasetti, president

References

External links
 Institute for Scientific Interchange (ISI Foundation)

Physics institutes
Organizations established in 1983
Universities in Italy
Education in Turin
Universities in Piedmont